On 25 July 2000, Air France Flight 4590, a Concorde passenger jet on an international charter flight from Paris to New York, crashed shortly after takeoff, killing all 109 people on board and four on the ground. It was the only fatal Concorde accident during its 27-year operational history.

While taking off from Charles de Gaulle Airport, the aircraft ran over debris on the runway, causing a tyre to blow up and disintegrate. Tyre fragments, flung by the rapidly spinning wheel, violently struck the underside of the wing, damaging parts of the landing gear – thus preventing its retraction – and causing the integral fuel tank to rupture. Large amounts of fuel leaking from the rupture ignited, causing a loss of thrust in the left-hand-side engines 1 and 2. The aircraft lifted off, but the loss of thrust, high drag from the extended landing gear, and fire damage to the flight controls made it impossible to maintain control. The jet crashed into a hotel in nearby Gonesse two minutes after takeoff. All nine crew and 100 passengers on board were killed, as well as four people in the hotel. Six other people in the hotel were critically injured.

In the wake of the disaster, the entire Concorde fleet was grounded. It returned to service on November 7, 2001, following the implementation of various modifications to the airframe, but to limited commercial success. The type was finally retired in 2003: May at Air France; October at British Airways.

Aircraft and crew

The aircraft involved was a 25-year-old Aérospatiale-BAC Concorde (registration F-BTSC, serial number 203) that had its maiden flight on 31 January 1975 (during testing, the aircraft's registration was F-WTSC). The aircraft was leased to Air France on 6 January 1976. It joined the Air France fleet full-time in 1980. It was powered by four Rolls-Royce Olympus 593/610 turbojet engines, each of which was equipped with afterburners. The aircraft's last scheduled repair had taken place on 21 July 2000, four days before the accident; no problems were reported during the repair. At the time of the crash, the aircraft had flown for 11,989 hours and had made 4,873 take-off and landing cycles.

The cockpit crew consisted of the following:
 Captain Christian Marty (age 53), who had been with Air France since 1967. He had 13,477 flight hours, including 317 hours on the Concorde. Marty had also flown the Boeing 727, 737, Airbus A300, A320, and A340 aircraft.
 First officer Jean Marcot (50), who had been with Air France since 1971 and had 10,035 flight hours, with 2,698 of them on the Concorde. He had also flown the Aérospatiale N 262, Morane-Saulnier MS.760 Paris, Sud Aviation Caravelle and Airbus A300 aircraft.
 Flight engineer Gilles Jardinaud (58), who had been with Air France since 1968. He had 12,532 flight hours, of which 937 were on the Concorde aircraft. Jardinaud had also flown the Sud Aviation Caravelle, Dassault Falcon 20, Boeing 727, 737, and 747 (including the -400 variant) aircraft.

Crash
The wind at the airport was light and variable that day, and was reported to the cockpit crew as an  tailwind as they lined up on runway 26R.

It did not directly puncture any of the fuel tanks, but it sent out a pressure shockwave that ruptured the number 5 fuel tank at its weakest point, just ahead of the left landing gear well. Leaking fuel gushing out from the bottom of the wing was most likely ignited either by an electric arc in the landing gear bay (debris cutting the landing gear wire) or through contact with hot parts of the engine. Engines 1 and 2 both surged and lost all power, likely due to ingestion of hot gases (both engines) and tyre debris (engine 1 only), and then engine 1 slowly recovered over the next few seconds. A large plume of flame developed, and the flight engineer shut down engine 2 in response to a fire warning and the captain's command.

Air traffic controller Gilles Logelin noticed the flames before the Concorde was airborne and informed the flight crew. However, the aircraft had passed V1 speed, at which point takeoff is considered unsafe to abort. The plane did not gain enough airspeed with the three remaining engines as damage to the landing gear bay door prevented the retraction of the undercarriage. The aircraft was unable to climb or accelerate, and its speed decayed during the course of its brief flight. The fire damaged the inner elevon of the left wing and it began to disintegrate, melted by the extremely high temperatures. Engine number 1 surged again, but did not fully recover, and the right wing lifted from the asymmetrical thrust, banking the aircraft to over 100 degrees. The crew reduced the power on engines three and four in an attempt to level the aircraft, but they lost control due to deceleration and the aircraft stalled. The aircraft struck the ground left wing low after a heading change of nearly 180°, crashing into the Hôtelissimo Les Relais Bleus Hotel. A video of the burning plane on takeoff and the aftermath of the crash was captured by a passing driver.

The crew was trying to divert to nearby Paris–Le Bourget Airport, but accident investigators stated that a safe landing would have been highly unlikely, given the aircraft's flightpath. The cockpit voice recorder (CVR) recorded the last intelligible words in the cockpit (translated into English):

Fatalities

The flight was chartered by German company Peter Deilmann Cruises. The passengers were on their way to board the cruise ship MS Deutschland in New York for a 16-day cruise to Manta, Ecuador. They included German football manager Rudi Faßnacht and German trade union board member Christian Götz.

All the passengers and crew, and four employees of the Hotelissimo hotel were killed in the crash.

Aftermath

A few days after the crash, all Air France Concordes were grounded, pending an investigation into the cause of the crash and possible remedies.

Air France's Concorde operation had been a money-losing venture, and it is claimed that the aeroplane had been kept in service as a matter of national pride; British Airways claimed to make a profit on its Concorde operations. According to Jock Lowe, a Concorde pilot, until the crash of Air France Flight 4590 at Paris, the British Airways Concorde operation made a net average profit of about £30M (equivalent to £M in ) a year. Commercial service was resumed on November 7, 2001, after a £17M (£M today) safety improvement programme, until the type was retired between May (Air France) and October (British Airways), 2003.

Despite the accident, Concorde was still considered among the world's safest aircraft.  This was the only fatal accident of the Concorde's entire career.

Investigation
The official investigation was conducted by France's accident investigation bureau, the Bureau of Enquiry and Analysis for Civil Aviation Safety (BEA).

Fuel transfer during taxiing left the number 5 wing tank 94 percent full. A  spacer normally keeps the left main landing gear in alignment, but it had not been replaced after recent maintenance; the BEA concluded that this did not contribute to the accident.

The final report was issued on  2002.

Conclusions
The BEA concluded that:
Any effect on takeoff performance from this excess weight was negligible.
 After reaching takeoff speed, the tyre of the number 2 wheel was cut by a metal strip (a wear strip) lying on the runway, which had fallen from the thrust reverser cowl door of the number 3 engine of a Continental Airlines DC-10 that had taken off from the same runway five minutes previously. This wear strip had been replaced at Tel Aviv, Israel, during a C check on 11 June 2000, and then again at Houston, Texas, on 9 July 2000. The strip installed in Houston had been neither manufactured nor installed in accordance with the procedures as defined by the manufacturer.
 The aircraft was airworthy and the crew were qualified. The landing gear that later failed to retract had not shown serious problems in the past. Despite the crew being trained and certified, no plan existed for the simultaneous failure of two engines on the runway, as it was considered highly unlikely.
 Aborting the takeoff would have led to a high-speed runway excursion and collapse of the landing gear, which also would have caused the aircraft to crash.
 While two of the engines had problems and one of them was shut down, the damage to the plane's structure was so severe that the crash would have been inevitable, even with the engines operating normally.

Additional factors and alternative theories
Former British Airways (BA) Concorde captain John Hutchinson, said the fire on its own should have been 'eminently survivable; the pilot should have been able to fly his way out of trouble'. Hutchinson believed this did not happen due to a series of operational errors and 'negligence' by the maintenance department.  According to a report in a British newspaper, by journalist David Rose, the crash had "more than one contributing factor, most of which were avoidable."  

While examining the wreckage in a warehouse, investigators noticed that a spacer was missing from the bogie beam on the left-hand main landing gear. (It was later found in an Air France maintenance workshop.) This skewed the alignment of the landing gear because a strut was able to wobble in any direction with 3° of movement. The problem was exacerbated on the left gear's three remaining tyres by the uneven fuel load. Drag marks left on the runway by the left rear landing wheels show the Concorde was veering to the left as it accelerated toward takeoff. Photographs in the BEA report showed a smashed steel landing light, clipped by the aircraft, parts of which were probably ingested by engine number 1.

According to Rose, former French Concorde pilot Jean-Marie Chauve, and former Concorde flight engineer Michel Suaud, spent six months preparing a 60-page report which was submitted to the investigating judge. They re-evaluated two factors that the BEA had found to be of negligible consequence to the crash, the unbalanced weight distribution in the fuel tanks and the loose landing gear. Chauve and Suaud gave detailed calculations, stating that without the retardation caused by the missing undercarriage spacer, the aircraft would have taken off 1684 metres from the start of the runway, before the point where the metal strip was located, although the BEA disputed this, saying the acceleration was normal.

At the start of the takeoff, the aircraft had 1.2 tonnes of extra fuel which should have been burnt during the aircraft's taxi.  Nineteen items of luggage, weighing some 500kg (0.5 tonnes) were loaded onto the aircraft at the last minute without being included in the aircraft's manifest, giving the aircraft a weight of 186 tonnes, which exceeded the aircraft's certified maximum structural weight by one tonne.  A change in wind conditions created an 8 knot tailwind, which would have reduced the regulated takeoff weight to 180 tonnes, six tonnes below the actual aircraft weight.  Rather than to take off from the other end of the runway to take off into the wind, no change in takeoff direction occurred.  The additional weight of the extra fuel in tank 11, the rearmost tank, plus the additional luggage shifted the aircraft's centre of gravity rearwards, to beyond the safe operating limit of 54 per cent, set by the Concorde test pilots.  Once the damaged forward tank 5 began to lose fuel, the centre of gravity moved even further rearward.  
At one point, it drifted toward a just-landed Air France Boeing 747 that was carrying then-French President Jacques Chirac (who was returning from the 26th G8 summit meeting in Okinawa, Japan). As the plane was about to leave the tarmac, with the aircraft rotated for takeoff at a speed of only 188 knots, 11 knots under the minimum recommended velocity. The flight engineer shut down engine number two at only 25 feet altitude. The procedure for shutting down an engine is to wait until stable flight at 400 feet is achieved, and then only on the command of the captain.

Previous tyre incidents
In November 1981, the American National Transportation Safety Board (NTSB) sent a letter of concern to the French BEA that included safety recommendations for Concorde. The NTSB described those incidents as "potentially catastrophic", because they were caused by blown tyres during takeoff. During its 27 years in service, Concorde had about 70 tyre- or wheel-related incidents, seven of which caused serious damage to the aircraft or were potentially catastrophic.
 13 June 1979: The number 5 and 6 tyres blew out during a takeoff from Washington Dulles International Airport. Fragments thrown from the tyres and rims damaged number 2 engine, punctured three fuel tanks, severed several hydraulic lines and electrical wires, and tore a large hole on the top of the wing over the wheel well area.
 21 July 1979: Another blown tyre incident during takeoff from Dulles Airport. After that second incident the "French director general of civil aviation issued an Airworthiness Directive and Air France issued a Technical Information Update, each calling for revised procedures. These included required inspection of each wheel and tyre for condition, pressure, and temperature prior to each takeoff. In addition, crews were advised that landing gear should not be raised when a wheel/tyre problem is suspected."
 August 1981: British Airways (BA) plane taking off from New York suffered a blow-out, damaging landing gear door, engine, and fuel tank.
 November 1985: Tyre burst on a BA plane leaving Heathrow, causing damage to the landing gear door and fuel tank. Two engines were damaged as a result of the accident.
 January 1988: BA plane leaving Heathrow lost 10 bolts from its landing gear wheel. A fuel tank was punctured.
 July 1993: Tyre burst on a BA plane during landing at Heathrow, causing substantial ingestion damage to the number 3 engine, damaging the landing gear and wing, and puncturing an empty fuel tank.
 October 1993: Tyre burst on a BA plane during taxi at Heathrow, puncturing wing, damaging fuel tanks, and causing a major fuel leak.

Because it is a tailless delta-wing aircraft, Concorde could not use the normal flaps or slats to assist takeoff and landing, and required a significantly higher air and tyre speed during the takeoff roll than an average airliner. That higher speed increased the risk of tyre burst during takeoff. Analysis of test results revealed the level of kinetic energy necessary to cause the rupture of fuel tank. The piece could reach this speed by combination of rotation of the tyre on takeoff and the tyre burst.

Modifications and revival
The accident led to modifications to Concorde, including more-secure electrical controls, Kevlar lining to the fuel tanks, and specially developed burst-resistant tyres.

The crash of the Air France Concorde nonetheless proved to be the beginning of the end for the type. Just before service resumed, the September 11 attacks took place, resulting in a marked drop in passenger numbers, and contributing to the eventual end of Concorde flights.

In June 2010, two groups attempted, unsuccessfully, to revive Concorde for "Heritage" flights in time for the 2012 Olympics. The British Save Concorde Group, SCG, and French group Olympus 593 were attempting to get four Rolls-Royce Olympus engines at Le Bourget Air and Space Museum.

Criminal investigation
French authorities began a criminal investigation of Continental Airlines, whose plane dropped the debris on the runway, in March 2005, and that September, Henri Perrier, the former chief engineer of the Concorde division at Aérospatiale at the time of the first test flight in 1969 and the programme director in the 1980s and early 1990s, was placed under formal investigation.

In March 2008, Bernard Farret, a deputy prosecutor in Pontoise, outside Paris, asked judges to bring manslaughter charges against Continental Airlines and two of its employees – John Taylor, the mechanic who replaced the wear strip on the DC-10, and his manager Stanley Ford – alleging negligence in the way the repair was carried out. Continental denied the charges, and claimed in court that it was being used as a scapegoat by the BEA. The airline suggested that the Concorde "was already on fire when its wheels hit the titanium strip, and that around 20 first-hand witnesses had confirmed that the plane seemed to be on fire immediately after it began its take-off roll".

At the same time, charges were laid against Henri Perrier, head of the Concorde program at Aérospatiale, Jacques Hérubel, Concorde's chief engineer, and Claude Frantzen, head of DGAC, the French airline regulator. It was alleged that Perrier, Hérubel, and Frantzen knew that the plane's fuel tanks could be susceptible to damage from foreign objects, but nonetheless allowed it to fly.

The trial ran in a Parisian court from February to December 2010. Continental Airlines was found criminally responsible for the disaster. It was fined €200,000 ($271,628) and ordered to pay Air France . Taylor was given a 15-month suspended sentence, while Ford, Perrier, Hérubel, and Frantzen were cleared of all charges. The court ruled that the crash resulted from a piece of metal from a Continental jet that was left on the runway; the object punctured a tyre on the Concorde and then ruptured a fuel tank. The convictions were overturned by a French appeals court in November 2012, thereby clearing Continental and Taylor of criminal responsibility.

The Parisian court also ruled that Continental would have to pay 70% of any compensation claims. As Air France had paid out  to the families of the victims, Continental could be made to pay its share of that compensation payout. The French appeals court, while overturning the criminal rulings by the Parisian court, affirmed the civil ruling and left Continental liable for the compensation claims.

Legacy

A monument in honour of the crash victims was established at Gonesse. The Gonesse monument consists of a piece of transparent glass with a piece of an aircraft wing jutting through. Another monument, a  memorial surrounded with topiary planted in the shape of a Concorde, was established in 2006 at Mitry-Mory, just south of Charles de Gaulle Airport.

Documentaries and other media
 The Concorde that crashed was the primary aircraft extensively used in The Concorde ... Airport '79.
 The timeline and causes of the crash were profiled in the premiere episode of the National Geographic documentary series Seconds From Disaster.
 NBC aired a Dateline NBC documentary on the crash, its causes, and its legacy on  2009.
 Channel 4 and Discovery Channel Canada aired a documentary called Concorde's Last Flight.
 Smithsonian Channel aired a 90-minute documentary in 2010.
 The accident and subsequent investigation were featured in the 7th episode during Season 14 of the Canadian documentary series Mayday (also known as Air Crash Investigation) titled "Concorde: Up in Flames", first broadcast in January 2015.
 In 2020, Montreal synth-pop group Le Couleur released an album, Concorde, inspired by the story of this crash.

References

BEA

External links

 Bureau of Enquiry and Analysis for Civil Aviation Safety
 "Accident on 25 July 2000 at "La Patte d'oie" at Gonesse ." (Alternate) (Archive)
 Preliminary report published 1 September 2000
 Interim report published 15 December 2000
 Interim report 2 published 23 July 2001
 Final report (Archive) (PDF, Archive) published 16 January 2002
 "Accident survenu le 25 juillet 2000 au lieu-dit "La Patte d'oie" à Gonesse ." (Alternate ) (Archive)  – the French version is the report of record.
 Preliminary report  (PDF, Archive), published 1 September 2000.
 Interim report  (PDF, Archive), published 15 December 2000.
 Interim report 2  (PDF, Archive), published 23 July 2001.
 Final report  (PDF, Archive), published 16 January 2002
 PlaneCrashInfo.Com – Data Entry on Flight 4590
 
 Doomed – The Real Story of Flight 4590: Special Investigation, The Guardian, 13 May 2001. – mentions other contributing factors
 Disaster, CBS News
 CVR transcript
 All 109 Aboard Dead in Concorde Crash into Hotel Near Paris; 4 On Ground Dead  – CNN
 
 
 

2000 disasters in France
2000 in France
2000 fires in Europe
2000s in Île-de-France
Accidents and incidents involving the McDonnell Douglas DC-10
4590
Airliner accidents and incidents caused by in-flight fires
Airliner accidents and incidents caused by mechanical failure
Aviation accidents and incidents in 2000
Aviation accidents and incidents in France
Charles de Gaulle Airport
Concorde
Disasters in Île-de-France
History of Val-d'Oise
July 2000 events in France